Mariam Mamadashvili (born 16 November 2005) is a Georgian singer. She won the Junior Eurovision Song Contest 2016 where she represented Georgia with the song "Mzeo". She moved to the United States in 2015.

Biography
Mamadashvili has been performing since she was four years old. She studied at the Bzikebistudio in Georgia and also the Evgeni Mikeladze State Central Music School. Since moving to the United States, she has been enrolled at Tomlinson Middle School and Broadway Method Academy, and resides in Fairfield, Connecticut.

Discography

References

External links

2005 births
Living people
Musicians from Tbilisi
Child singers from Georgia (country)
21st-century women singers from Georgia (country)
Junior Eurovision Song Contest winners
Expatriates from Georgia (country) in the United States
People from Fairfield, Connecticut